Talent Patrol was an American game show during the 1950s. The series stars Arlene Francis and later Steve Allen as the hosts. The series ran on the American Broadcasting Company from 1953-1955.

Broadcast history

Talent Patrol originally was broadcast on Monday nights from 9:30-10:00 pm. Starting with season two, the series moved to Saturdays at 8-8:30 pm. Its primetime competition was The Jackie Gleason Show on CBS, Bonino on NBC and National Football League Professional Football on DuMont. Beginning in April 1954, the series moved to Thursdays at 8-8:30 pm. Its third and last season aired on Sunday nights from 9:30-10:00 pm.

References

External links

1953 American television series debuts
1955 American television series endings
American Broadcasting Company original programming
Black-and-white American television shows
English-language television shows
Talent shows